Alexander Gahon Gesmundo (born November 6, 1956) is serving as the chief justice of the Philippines since April 5, 2021. He replaced Diosdado Peralta, who retired early on March 27, 2021. He previously served as an associate justice of the Supreme Court from 2017 to 2021.

Biography

Gesmundo is the fourth chief justice appointed by President Rodrigo Duterte and the third Atenean to assume the post of the high tribunal.

Gesmundo is a member of the Philippine Independent Church. He studied Bachelor of Science in Economics at the Lyceum of the Philippines University while he obtained his law degree from the Ateneo de Manila University in 1984 and passed the Philippine Bar in April 1985.

He started working as a trial attorney at the Office of the Solicitor General (OSG) in 1985 and was awarded the Most Outstanding Solicitor three years later.

He was on seconded appointment as commissioner of the Presidential Commission on Good Government from July 17, 1998 to February 15, 2001.

In August 2002, he was promoted to assistant solicitor general. He continued to serve in the OSG until October 2005.

After 20 years with the OSG, he was then appointed as an associate justice of the Sandiganbayan on October 15, 2005, later as chairperson of its seventh division and co-chairperson of the Committee on Rules. 

On August 14, 2017, Gesmundo became the 178th Supreme Court magistrate, assuming the post vacated by Justice Jose C. Mendoza who reached mandatory retirement age. 

As chief justice, he will mandatorily retire on November 6, 2026.

References

1956 births
Living people
Associate Justices of the Supreme Court of the Philippines
Justices of the Sandiganbayan
Ateneo de Manila University alumni
Chief justices of the Supreme Court of the Philippines
Members of the Philippine Independent Church